Chatri is one of the 51 union councils of Abbottabad District in Khyber-Pakhtunkhwa province of Pakistan. According to the 2017 Census of Pakistan, the population is 13,833.

Subdivisions
 Bandi Mansoor
 Chatri
 Gali Banian
 Kathwal
 Mera Rehmat Khan
 Mohar Kalan

References

Union councils of Abbottabad District